Khaled El-Kashef (born 1 October 1946) is an Egyptian water polo player. He competed in the men's tournament at the 1968 Summer Olympics.

References

External links
 

1946 births
Living people
Egyptian male water polo players
Olympic water polo players of Egypt
Water polo players at the 1968 Summer Olympics
Sportspeople from Cairo
20th-century Egyptian people